Eucalyptus microneura, commonly known as Gilbert River box, is a species of small to medium-sized tree that is endemic to Queensland. It has rough, fibrous or flaky bark on the trunk and branches, lance-shaped adult leaves, flowers in groups of seven on a branching peduncle, white flowers and conical fruit.

Description
It has rough, fissured, fibrous or flaky, greyish brown bark on the trunk and branches. Young plants and coppice regrowth have dull greyish, bluish or glaucous, lance-shaped leaves. Flowering has been recorded in January and February and the flowers are white.

Taxonomy and naming
Eucalyptus microneura was first formally described in 1925 by Joseph Maiden and William Blakely and the description was published in Journal and Proceedings of the Royal Society of New South Wales from specimens collected by Cyril Tenison White. The specific epithet (microneura) is from the ancient Greek micro- meaning "little" or "small" and neuron meaning nerve, possibly referring to the inconspicuous leaf veins.

Distribution and habitat
Gilbert River box grows in forest and woodland, usually on river flats, and is found on Cape York Peninsula as far south as Rainscourt Station, near Richmond.

Conservation status
This eucalypt is classified as "least concern" by the Queensland Government Department of Environment and Science.

See also
List of Eucalyptus species

References

Trees of Australia
microneura
Myrtales of Australia
Flora of Queensland
Plants described in 1925
Taxa named by Joseph Maiden
Taxa named by William Blakely